State Road 30 (SR 30) is the mostly hidden Florida Department of Transportation designation for most of US 98 from the Florida-Alabama state line to east of Perry, Florida.

In a 14-mile-long stretch west of Panama City, US 98 and SR 30 are separated by less than one mile (1.6 km), with SR 30 on Front Beach Road along the shore of the Gulf of Mexico in Hollywood Beach, Laguna Beach, and Panama City Beach, and US 98 inland (as unsigned State Road 30A) along Panama City Beach Parkway bypassing the beach communities. In 2009, the Florida DOT began signing Front Beach Road as SR 30, and removed US 98 Alt signs.

In Panama City, and Callaway, US 98 and SR 30 take different courses as they pass through the two cities, in which SR 30 becomes Business US 98 and US 98 becomes unsigned SR 30A (for more details on the routing through Panama City and Callaway, click here).  Both at the western and eastern end of the split, US 98 and SR 30 merge upon approach of a bridge (on Panama City Parkway crossing Saint Andrew Bay to the west; and, to the east, New Dupont Bridge crossing East Bay for access to – and through – Tyndall Air Force Base).

The eastern terminus of SR 30 is an intersection with US 19-US 27-SR 20 in Perry.  There, a motorist driving eastbound on US 98 (West Hampton Springs Avenue) can turn southward onto its continuation on Byron Butler Parkway (Alternate US 27-US 19-US 98).  Motorists continuing eastward on East Hampton Springs Avenue travel along southbound US 27-SR 20 toward Mayo, Alachua, and Gainesville.

History

FDOT announced in January 2010, near the end of the Pensacola Bay Bridge's 50-year design life, that the bridge was structurally deficient and would have to be replaced within six years.  As of 2011, a study is underway to determine the "feasibility, location, and conceptual design" of a replacement bridge. As of February 2013, plans have begun to replace the bridge with construction beginning within two years, at a cost of $595.6 million, on a course slightly to the west of the existing bridge.  The new bridge, like the current one, will not charge a toll. As of February 2020, construction of the new bridge is complete with only the pedestrian portion to be completed with the old bridge being dismantled to make way for the parallel bridge to begin construction. However, just months later during Hurricane Sally on September 15-16, 2020, a barge got stuck under the bridge before a crane fell onto one span of the bridge; this knocked almost the entire span into Pensacola Bay, rendering the bridge completely unusable; repairs were quickly arranged, with the bridge planned to be reopened in March 2021.

Major intersections

Related routes

Bay County Road 30

County Road 30 (CR 30) runs along a segment of Front Beach Road in Laguna Beach. The former section of SR 30 was relinquished by the Florida Department of Transportation in exchange for County Road 390. CR 30 runs from the junction with  U.S. 98/SR 30A/SR 30 eastbound and ends at the intersection with Deluna Place on the city line of Panama City Beach, where SR 30 resumes.

State Road 30A

State Road 30A (SR 30A) is a Florida Department of Transportation designation shared by four alternate routings of SR 30 in the Florida panhandle. Two segments have SR 30A signage; the other two do not as they are segments of U.S. Route 98 (US 98). Three of the four SR 30A segments are next to the shore of the Gulf of Mexico for most (if not all) of their length.

Walton County Road 30A

Just west of Santa Rosa Beach, near East Hewlett Road, County Road 30A branches off Reddick Road (US 98/SR 30) and heads southeastward toward the shore of the Gulf of Mexico. While US 98/SR 30 continues through the heart of Point Washington State Forest, CR 30A follows the shoreline, passing through Grayton Beach and Seaside, before rejoining SR 30 near Inlet Beach.

Gulf County Road 30A & Franklin County Road 30A

County Road 30A in Gulf and Franklin counties is a former segment of SR 30A. The road follows the shoreline of Bay San Blas, Indian Lagoon, and Saint Vincent Sound from the junction with SR 30A and SR 30E to US 98.

State Road 30B

State Road 30B is an unsigned road in Pensacola known locally as Gregory Square. Running east from Gregory Street, it dead ends at a culdesac a mere  later. The road was once part of State Road 30, until it was realigned. Gregory Street is maintained by FDOT and is inventoried as part of State Road 30, but it is not a signed road.

Gulf County Road 30B

County Road 30B (CR 30B), formerly State Road 30B, runs along St. Joseph Peninsula and is known locally as Indian Pass Road. It was a scenic route, with the western terminus at an intersection with CR 30A and an eastern terminus at the Indian Pass campground.

State Road 30E

State Road 30E (SR 30E) exists on the St. Joseph Peninsula and is known locally as Cape San Blas Road. It's a scenic route, with the western terminus in St. Joseph Peninsula State Park near Eagle Harbor. Eastbound motorists drive by the T.H. Stone Memorial and the Cape San Blas lighthouse as they approach the terminus of SR 30E, an intersection with the SR 30A loop roughly a mile south of St. Joseph Point Lighthouse.

Bay County Roads 30A, 30B, 30C, 30H, and 30P
In Panama City Beach, a series of former state roads exist that were relinquished to Bay County control, all of which were alternatives to State Road 30. All routes are named after their former state road numbers, except for CR 30P, which is the former SR 30F.

State Road 392A
As the 16-mile-long SR 30 parallels the Gulf Coast, it passes through Hollywood Beach, Sunnyside, Laguna Beach, and Panama City Beach—popular "Spring Break" stops for U.S. college students—before curving back inland to rejoin US 98. The popularity of the Panama City Beach beachfront (with Miracle Strip Amusement Park) has often resulted in the overloading of Front Beach Road and the prompting of FDOT's "creation" of a second bypass of the downtown area: the three-mile (5 km) long SR 392A.

Locally known as Hutchison Boulevard, it is signed east–west. The western terminus is an intersection with SR 30 Alternate near Youpon Road; the eastern terminus is an intersection with SR 30 at Thomas Drive.

References

030
030
030
030
030
030
030
030
030
030
030
030
U.S. Route 98